Loli most often refers to:
 A young or young-looking girl character in Japanese anime and manga; subjects of the lolicon genre

Loli may also refer to:

People

Surname
 Peter Loli (born 1980), Australian rugby union player
 Silvia Loli, Peruvian politician

Given name
 Loli Kantor (born 1952), Israeli-American photographer
 Loli Sánchez (born 1964), Spanish former professional basketball player

Places
 Loli (district), in West Sumba Regency, East Nusa Tenggara, Indonesia

Other
 LOLI Database (list of lists), an international chemical regulatory database

See also
 Lolli, an Italian surname
 Lolly (disambiguation)
 Lolita (disambiguation)